Robin Johnson is an actress.

Robin or Robyn Johnson may also refer to:

Robin Johnson (singer)
Robin Johnson (1929–1989) of the Johnson Baronets
Robyn Johnson (field hockey), South African field hockey player
Robyn Johnson (Miss Wyoming USA), beauty queen

See also
Robin Johnston (disambiguation)